Kerry Dennis O'Brien (born 17 April 1946) is a retired Australian runner. Competing in the steeplechase he won a silver medal at the 1966 British Empire and Commonwealth Games and finished fourth at the 1968 Summer Olympics. He held the world record in this event between 1970 and 1972. At the 1970 Commonwealth Games, O'Brien fell at the penultimate water-jump, while leading, and failed to finish the race. He also fell during the 1972 Olympics. He retired in 1973 having won nine Australian titles in the steeplechase, 5000 m and cross-country running.

International competitions

References

1946 births
Living people
Place of birth missing (living people)
Australian male middle-distance runners
Olympic athletes of Australia
World record setters in athletics (track and field)
Athletes (track and field) at the 1968 Summer Olympics
Athletes (track and field) at the 1972 Summer Olympics
Athletes (track and field) at the 1966 British Empire and Commonwealth Games
Athletes (track and field) at the 1970 British Commonwealth Games
Commonwealth Games silver medallists for Australia
Commonwealth Games medallists in athletics
Australian male steeplechase runners
People from Port Augusta
Sportsmen from South Australia
Medallists at the 1966 British Empire and Commonwealth Games